John Charles MacKenzie (born October 17, 1970) is a Canadian actor. He is best known for portraying  Skip Fontaine on the HBO series Vinyl (2016) and Reagan "Normal" Ronald on the Fox series Dark Angel (2000–2002). He has also appeared in several films directed by Martin Scorsese, including The Aviator (2004), The Departed (2006), The Wolf of Wall Street (2013), and The Irishman (2019).

Early life
John Charles MacKenzie was born in Peterborough, Ontario on October 17, 1970, one of four sons born to nurse Mary and pharmacist Bill MacKenzie. He was raised in Ottawa, Ontario, and attended Pinecrest Public School and Sir John A. Macdonald High School. He later studied at Concordia University and the London Academy of Music and Dramatic Art (LAMDA).

Career
MacKenzie spent several years working in theatre across Canada until he was picked by Neil Simon to do the national tour of Simon's play Biloxi Blues, which ran for over 600 performances over the course of a year and a half. His first television success came as Arnold Spivak in the Emmy Award-winning television series Murder One, which ran for two seasons on ABC. He was cast as Reagan "Normal" Ronald in the series Dark Angel, which won a People's Choice Award and ran for two seasons on Fox. Some of his more recent notable roles include Fred Allen on October Faction, Dr. Arnold Spivak on Hemlock Grove and Skip Fontaine on Vinyl. He has made over 150 television appearances and has appeared in the Martin Scorsese films The Irishman, The Aviator, The Departed, and The Wolf of Wall Street.

Personal life
MacKenzie is married to American screenwriter Erin Cressida Wilson. They have one son, Liam, and split their time between Los Angeles and New York City.

Filmography

Film

Television

References

External links

1970 births
Canadian male film actors
Canadian male television actors
Living people
Concordia University alumni
Male actors from Ontario
People from Peterborough, Ontario
Alumni of the London Academy of Music and Dramatic Art
Canadian expatriate male actors in the United States
20th-century Canadian male actors
21st-century Canadian male actors